, taglined Under the innocent sky., is the fifth visual novel developed by Navel. Before the game's release, a prequel game named Oretachi ni Tsubasa wa Nai ~Prelude~ containing bonus scenarios and events before the timeline of the game was released on June 28, 2008. This release did not contain hentai scenes. The limited edition of the game was released on 30 January 2009. A standard version of the game was released on 24 April 2009. A fandisc named Oretachi ni Tsubasa wa Nai AfterStory was released on July 30, 2010. A non-adult version remake, titled Oretachi ni Tsubasa wa Nai R, of the Windows game was released on May 27, 2011. The game has also received several manga adaptations. An anime adaptation by the studio Nomad started airing on April 4, 2011.

Plot
It is winter in the big city of Yanagihara, and young people will meet and fall in love. Takashi Haneda is a teenage boy who plans to escape to another world, but is held back by thoughts of his younger sister Kobato Haneda and his girlfriend Asuka Watarai. Shūsuke Chitose is a poor part-timer who has to work with student-author Hiyoko Tamaizumi in spite of their initial dislike for each other. The antisocial Hayato Narita makes his living as a handyman until he is visited by a girl named Naru Ohtori.

The anime series is split into three separate vignettes covering the activities of three main groups of people. The first has Takashi Haneda as the main male lead and is focused around his school activities and direct acquaintances. The second has Shūsuke Chitose as the main male lead and is focused around a bar called Alexander and his direct acquaintances. The third has Hayato Narita as the main male lead and focuses on his street acquaintances. As the series progresses, the vignettes become more complex and intertwined, while still being presented in chronological order. Some offshoot stories are told, but they have direct connection to the above three main male characters.

Characters

Main characters
The main characters include the main male leads and the main heroines of the series who appear in each or all of the vignettes.

The main male lead for the school vignette, who goes to a high school in Yanagihara city. He considers himself a hero of a fantasy realm of Gredaguard for which he "escapes" to frequently, going by the name Lord Hawk Cyan-Blue. He befriends Asuka and pretends to be her boyfriend as a favor to her. As the series progresses, it is revealed that his illness is somehow connected to his "escapes", and thinks he is a knight from Gredaguard. He has no knowledge of the other male protagonists. He is named after Tokyo's main domestic airport Tokyo International Airport, commonly known as Haneda Airport.

 (Windows) / Mayumi Yoshida (Drama CD and anime), Felecia Angelle (English, anime)
Takashi's classmate, part of the school vignette. She asked him to be her fake boyfriend because she was tired of rejecting all the guys who asked her out. She suffered a split personality illness when she was a child, however has recovered from it. She also wants to help Takashi with his illness, for which she is seen later confronting the latter about it without knowing a secret only known by Kobato and the other main male leads.

The main male lead for the bar vignette, who is a poor part-timer at Alexander. He also does freelance reporting and book reviewing. Kakeru Ohtori is a good friend of his and knows of his special nickname, Eagle. He befriends Hiyoko at Alexander. He knows of both Hayato Narita and Takashi, even conspiring with Hayato at times to help Takashi, unbeknownst to the latter. He is named after New Chitose Airport in Sapporo, Hokkaido.

 (Windows) / Ryōko Ono (Drama CD and anime), Milly Prower (English, anime)
Shūsuke's coworker, part of the bar vignette. She is an aspiring novelist who thinks her books will be a success in the future, occasionally writing under the pseudonyms Tama Izumi and Tamaki Hosokawa. She eventually takes a job at Alexander to help with her income.

The main male lead of the street vignette, who is a handyman with an antisocial personality. He is also known as Dracula or Drac for short due to only "appearing" at night. His nickname with a few of his "old" friends is Falcon. He befriends Naru while being hired to help her find her bicycle. He knows of both Shūsuke and Takashi, even conspiring with Shūsuke at times to help Takashi, unbeknownst to the latter. He is named after Tokyo's main international airport Narita International Airport.

 (Windows) / Yūko Gotō (Drama CD and anime), Jād Saxton (English, anime)
A young high school girl and Kakeru's younger sister, part of the street vignette. She is a cheerful airhead and, despite her appearance, quite acute. She asks Hayato, her romantic interest, to help her look for her lost bicycle. She has a fetish for worker uniforms.

 (Windows) / Ai Matayoshi (Drama CD and anime), Mary Morgan (English, anime)
A first year middle school student and is the younger sister of Takashi and Yōji, part of all the vignettes. She knows everything about her brother, including the fact that he has multiple personalities.

The older brother of Kobato seen in between vignettes watching the main male leads on an orange TV in a secluded place, and it is implied that his hand is the one changing the channel each time.

Supporting characters
The supporting characters include the supporting male characters and the sub-heroines of the series who appear in one or two of the vignettes.

He is originally presented as two different people using the same name, but it is later revealed that he has a split personality. In the bar vignette, he is supposedly the ladies man who hangs out with Shūsuke at Alexander. In the street vignette, he is referred to as Phoenix, the crazy leader of the Yanagihara Flame Birds, and he is an old friend of Hayato, whom he refers to as Falcon. As the series progresses, the delineation between his personalities is not ruled by the separation of the vignettes.

In the bar vignette, he is a perverted bartender who works at Alexander. He hires Shūsuke as a waiter to be trained under Hiyoko.

 (Windows) / Eriko Kigawa (Drama CD and anime), Chloe Daniels (English, anime)
In the bar vignette, she is a colleague and friend of Kinako. A self-described party wrecker, who eventually stopped getting invited to parties because of it.

 (Windows) / Chiaki Takahashi (Drama CD and anime), Alexis Tipton (English, anime)
In the bar vignette, she is a college student working part-time at Alexander. While she generally has a cheerful disposition, it is hinted she lacks self-confidence when it comes to her entrance exams.

 (Windows) / Hiromi Ōtsuda (Drama CD and anime), Caitlin Glass (English, anime)
In the street vignette, she is a crepe vendor, who runs a vending cart named "Pal Crepe". She is caring, despite having a personality of a man, and she is endeared as "pal sister" from the old and young.

In the street vignette, he is the leader of R-Wing, a goth gang that is rivaled against the Yanagihara Flame Birds. He usually is seen playing a hand drum. In the school vignette, he is a classmate of Takashi and is jealous that Asuka has chosen to be in a relationship with Takashi.

In the street vignette, he is a member of the Yanagihara Flame Birds, a hip gang that is rivaled against R-Wing. In the school vignette, he is a friend of Takashi.

 (Windows) / Emiko Hagiwara (Drama CD and anime), Kristi Kang (English, anime)
In the bar vignette, she is Shūsuke's editor. She assigns Shūsuke to do an article review on Hiyoko's two bestselling novels.

 (Windows) / Saki Nakajima (Drama CD and anime), Brittney Karbowski (English, anime)
In the street vignette, she is a classmate and friend of Naru. However, she tries to claim Hayato as her husband whenever she sees him with Naru.

In the street vignette, he is introduced as King Garuta Dark-Black of Gredaguard. He temporarily possesses Hayato after the latter failed to protect Naru from Archbishop. He joins the Yanagihara Flame Birds to work alongside Kakeru, but he is unable to adapt to the human world. He later gives up control of the body after seeing Kobato in sadness of losing her brother.

 (Windows) / Yukiko Takaguchi (Drama CD and anime), Michelle Lee (English, anime)
In the school vignette, she is a classmate of Takashi who works at a drug store. She is shown to have two personalities, one of which is quiet and shy and the other of which is extroverted and talkative.

Other recurring characters
The other recurring characters include minor friends and acquaintances of the series who appear in one of the vignettes.
	

He is an unseen radio host announcer heard from an orange radio, usually making an appearance before the opening credits during an event involving the heroines and after the closing credits during the previews for the subsequent episodes.

She is an acquaintance of Hayato and a little girl, who generally has trouble learning street lingo.

He is an acquaintance of Hayato and an American foreigner, who makes a living selling jewelry.

He is a member of the Yanagihara Flame Birds. He usually raps whenever he speaks.

He is a member of the Yanagihara Flame Birds. He likes schoolgirl uniforms.

He is a member of the Yanagihara Flame Birds. He likes playboy bunny costumes.

He is a member of R-Wing. He was kicked out of the gang as a result of shooting Kakeru at the Twilight Rave Party, hosted by R-Wing at the train station. He attempted to kill Hayato, who was responsible for interfering with his chance of killing Kakeru in the first place.

She is a member of R-Wing.

He is a member of R-Wing.

He is a member of R-Wing.

She is a classmate of Takashi, who is blonde with an aggressive personality. She is assigned with Takashi to work on an essay together, and she tries to interfere with his relationship with Asuka.

He is a man who has dated 71 girls thus far.

He is the priest of the church of Gredaguard, who advises Shūsuke and Hayato to chant "that the world may know peace" over and over again whenever they find themselves or others in danger.

She is a friend of Kinako.

She is Kobato's middle school classmate and best friend.

Music
Sky Sanctuary by Miyuki Hashimoto is used for the opening of Oretachi ni Tsubasa wa Nai ~Prelude~ while Jewelry Tears by Aki Misato is used for the opening of the full version. The opening for the fandisc AfterStory is Cross Illusion by Aki Misato.
Spread Wings is used for the opening of the English subtitled version.

Anime
In November 2010, an anime television series based on the visual novel was announced. The 12-episode anime series is produced by Nomad under the direction of Shinji Ushiro and Takamitsu Kouno as script supervisor. The anime series uses the same voice cast as the drama CD. Oretachi ni Tsubasa wa Nai began its broadcast run in Japan on April 4, 2011. Funimation Entertainment acquired the series and added it on their video portal on June 24, 2011, followed by a DVD and Blu-ray release in 2013. An unaired OVA came bundled with the remake of the Windows game as a limited edition extra on May 27, 2011. The anime opening theme is "Spread Wings" by Aki Misato, and the ending theme is "NEVERLAND" by Miyuki Hashimoto. "PARANoiA" by Aki Misato was the ending theme for episode 1 and "Hohoemi Genocide" by Alex3 was the ending theme for episode 10.

DJ Condor, the unseen radio host announcer heard from an orange radio, appears in filler scenes before the opening credits, usually involving the heroines.

Episode list

Reception
The PlayStation 3 and PlayStation Vita ports both received review scores of 29/40 by Famitsu.

Notes

References

External links
  
 Anime official website 
 We Without Wings at Funimation
 
 

2008 video games
2011 Japanese television series debuts
2011 Japanese television series endings
Bishōjo games
Dissociative identity disorder in video games
Eroge
Funimation
Japan-exclusive video games
Nomad (company)
PlayStation 3 games
PlayStation Vita games
Video games developed in Japan
Visual novels
Windows games
Existentialist video games
Navel (company) games